Kneuterdijk Palace is a former royal palace of the Netherlands located in The Hague, nowadays the seat of the Council of State. Built in 1716 in the Louis XIV style by architect Daniel Marot, it was commissioned by Count Johan Hendrik of Wassenaer-Obdam, member of the House of Wassenaer. The palace served as a residence for King William II of the Netherlands and his wife Queen Anna Paulowna in the first half of the 19th century, when he was still the crown prince. William II added several buildings designed in the English Tudor style, of which only the so-called “Gothic Hall” has survived. The hall was designed after the great dining hall of Christ Church, Oxford, of which William II was an alumnus.

Their grandson Crown Prince William used the palace from 1858 till his death in 1879. In the 1930s the place was occasionally used by Princess Juliana. After World War II Dutch war criminals were tried in the former ballroom, some of whom were sentenced to death. Then the Ministry of Finance used the building for many years. Since restoration work was completed in 2001 the palace has been in use by the Netherlands' Council of State (Raad van State).

Gallery

Sources
 Travel Guide to the Hague

References

Houses completed in 1720
Rijksmonuments in The Hague
1720 establishments in the Dutch Republic
Royal residences in the Netherlands
Palaces in the Netherlands
18th-century architecture in the Netherlands